Albert E. Castel (1928–2014) was an American historian and author.

He specialized in Civil War history and historiography.

Life 

He was born on November 11, 1928, in Wichita, Kansas.

He died on November, 14th 2014 in Columbus, Ohio.

Career 

He graduated from the University of Chicago with a PhD. in history and taught at the Western Michigan University from 1960 to 1991.

Awards 

He won the Lincoln Prize for Best Civil War book in 1992 for his book Decision in the West.

Bibliography 

 Bloody Bill Anderson: The Short, Savage Life of a Civil War Guerrilla
 Decision in the West: The Atlanta Campaign of 1864
 General Sterling Price and the Civil War in the West
 William Clarke Quantrill: His Life and Times
 Civil War Kansas: Reaping the Whirlwind
 Winning and Losing the Civil War
 The campaign for Atlanta
 Victors in Blue: How Union Generals Fought the Confederates, Battled Each Other, and Won the Civil War 
 The Presidency of Andrew Johnson
 Articles of War: Winners, Losers, (and Some Who Were Both) During the Civil War
 A Frontier State at War: Kansas, 1861–1865

References

External links
 WorldCat

1928 births
2014 deaths
20th-century American historians
20th-century American male writers
Western Michigan University faculty
University of Kansas alumni
American male non-fiction writers